The Oulad Delim are a Bedouin Sahrawi tribe of Arab descent which originated in Yemen. They are descended from Delim bin Hassan, who was from the Ma'qili tribe of Beni Hassan which settled in the Sahara in the 12th century. They were formerly considered of Hassane status i.e. part of the ruling warrior stratum. The Oulad Delim speak Hassaniya Arabic, a Bedouin dialect which is very close to pure classical Arabic. They traditionally live in the southern regions of Western Sahara (Río de Oro), especially around the city of Dakhla. They have extensive tribal connections with northern Mauritanian tribes. They are Muslims, adhering to the Maliki school of Sunni Islam. 

Their traditional lifestyle was nomadic, based on camel herding. They were active in resisting Europe colonial advances during the 19th century, but after Spain consolidated its hold over Spanish Sahara, many Oulad Delim enrolled in the Tropas Nómadas and other Spanish auxiliary forces.

See also
 Djema'a
 Sahrawi people
 North African Arabs

References

Arab tribes in Morocco
Arab tribes in Mauritania
Arab tribes in Western Sahara
Bedouin groups
Sahrawi tribes
Tribes of Arabia